Owrteh Qamish (also Romanized as Owrteh Qamīsh; also known as Oorteh Ghomish, Orteh Qamīsh, Owrtā Qamīsh, Owrtāq Mīsh, Qāmīsh, Uktakh Ālmaj, Ūktakht Āmlaj, and Ūrtā Qamīsh) is a village in Boghrati Rural District, Sardrud District, Razan County, Hamadan Province, Iran. At the 2006 census, its population was 834, in 184 families.

References 

Populated places in Razan County